Charles M. Hoyt was a member of the Wisconsin State Assembly.

Biography
Hoyt was born on August 27, 1827 in Rush, New York. He moved to Milwaukee, Wisconsin in 1849. From 1864 to 1865, he was Sheriff of Milwaukee County, Wisconsin. Hoyt died in May 1871.

Political career
Hoyt was a member of the Assembly in 1871. Previously, he was a member of the Milwaukee Common Council in 1868.

References

People from Rush, New York
Politicians from Milwaukee
Members of the Wisconsin State Assembly
Wisconsin city council members
Wisconsin sheriffs
1827 births
1871 deaths
19th-century American politicians